Blakely Harbor is an inlet on the east shore of Bainbridge Island, Washington, south of Eagle Harbor.

Also known as Port Blakely, the harbor was once home to a major lumber mill business, the Port Blakely Mill Company, established . The mill burned to the ground in 1888 and again in 1907, but was rebuilt each time. The mill was "once known as the largest, highest-producing sawmill in the world". Blakely Harbor is now a residential neighborhood. The mill pond and ruins of the mill are accessible to the public in a city park at the west end of the harbor.

References

Bainbridge Island, Washington